USS Caiman (SS-323), a Balao-class submarine, was a ship of the United States Navy that was later transferred to the Turkish Naval Forces in 1972 under the Security Assistance Program, where she was recommissioned as the third TCG Dumlupınar. She was retired in 1986.

Career (US)

Originally Blanquillo, the vessel was renamed on 24 September 1942 after the caiman, a fresh water alligator inhabiting the Amazon River, and launched on 30 March 1944 by Electric Boat Co., Groton, Connecticut; sponsored by Mrs. R. C. Bonjour; commissioned 17 July 1944. She reported to the Pacific Fleet.

During World War II, Caiman sailed from Pearl Harbor on her first war patrol 13 November 1944. Pausing at Saipan to put ashore her severely ill commanding officer and embark his relief, the submarine pushed on to the South China Sea, where she combined offensive patrol with lifeguard duty as a part of air-sea rescue operations to save aviators downed in air strikes on enemy-held territory. Aggressive American submarine and naval air attack had already greatly reduced the Japanese merchant fleet; hence Caiman made no contacts on this patrol, from which she returned to Fremantle, Australia, on 22 January 1945 to refit.

Her second patrol, performed in the South China Sea and off the Gulf of Siam, from 18 February to 6 April, also yielded no contacts, but on her third, which began at Subic Bay in the Philippines on 28 April, she sank two small schooners. Their use illustrated graphically the almost complete loss of modern merchant ships which the Japanese had suffered largely at the hands of the U.S. Navy.

Returning to Fremantle 27 June from her patrol area off southern Indo-China and western Borneo, the submarine refitted for her fourth war patrol, during which she performed three dangerous special missions, landing and later evacuating agents from the coast of Java. On this patrol, which took place from 22 July to the end of hostilities, she sank another Japanese schooner. She returned to Subic Bay 19 August, then sailed for the West Coast.

Post-World War II, Caiman operated out of San Diego, Guam, and Pearl Harbor in 1946. In 1947 she made an Arctic familiarization cruise out of Seattle as part of Operation Blue Nose. Thereafter, based on Seattle, she served as reserve training ship until 23 April 1951, when she began a GUPPY conversion at Mare Island Naval Shipyard. Since then based at Pearl Harbor and San Diego, Caiman has alternated local operations and fleet exercises with tours of duty in the Far East at 18-month intervals. On her 1957 cruise, Brisbane, Australia, was added to her more usual itinerary of Japanese and Philippine ports.

Career (Turkey)

Caiman was decommissioned, struck from the Naval Register, and transferred to Turkey on 30 June 1972 under the terms of the Security Assistance Program. She arrived on 23 August 1972 to the Naval Yards in Gölcük and was commissioned the following day as the third TCG Dumlupınar (S-339) - an important name in Turkish history, and the name of the final and defining battle of the Turkish War of Independence.

Four years after Turkey took over ex-Caiman, she suffered a collision with Soviet freighter Szik Vovilov in the Dardanelles on 31 August 1976. TCG Dumlupinar was subsequently salvaged, repaired, and continued to serve in the Turkish Navy for 11 years before she was decommissioned and renamed Ceryan Botu (Y-1247) on 6 February 1983, under which name she served as a charging boat at Gölcük Navy Yards until she was permanently retired on 15 September 1986.

Honors and awards
  Navy Unit Commendation (August 1952)
  Asiatic-Pacific Campaign Medal with two battle stars for World War II service
  Navy Occupation Service Medal with "ASIA" clasp
  Navy E Ribbon (three awards: September 1955, 28 January 1966, 3 June 1972)

Of Caimans four World War II war patrols, the last was designated "successful".

References

External links

History of Turkish Submarines (1948–1972)
                  USS Caiman Association
                  USS Caiman World War II Database
                  USS Caiman (SS-323) History

Balao-class submarines
Ships built in Groton, Connecticut
1944 ships
World War II submarines of the United States
Cold War submarines of the United States
Ships transferred from the United States Navy to the Turkish Navy
Balao-class submarines of the Turkish Navy
Maritime incidents in 1976